DmC: Devil May Cry is a 2013 action-adventure game developed by Ninja Theory and published by Capcom. Released in January for PlayStation 3, Xbox 360, and Windows, it is a reboot of the Devil May Cry series. Announced in late 2010 during the Tokyo Game Show, the game is set in a parallel universe to the mainline Devil May Cry series.

The game's story focuses on the player character Dante, a young drifter who secretly hunts demons, who live among and rule over humans. Dante is a Nephilim, the child of an angel and a demon. He is reunited with Vergil, his twin brother, who enlists his help slaying powerful demons, culminating in a fight against Mundus, the demon king who murdered Dante's mother and condemned his father to eternal banishment and suffering. Players can use Dante's iconic sword, Rebellion, and signature handguns, Ebony and Ivory, as well as a variety of other melee weapons and firearms to defeat enemies. The game also introduces "Angel Mode" and "Demon Mode", which are modifiers to Dante's moveset.

The re-imagination of the Devil May Cry series was requested by Capcom, resulting in a total reboot. Capcom chose Ninja Theory to develop the game, assisting them to ensure that gameplay was reminiscent, but distinct, compared to previous titles. Early reaction to the game was widely negative, generally as a result of Dante's visual redesign and the drastic change in the tone of his character; nevertheless, DmC received positive reviews from critics upon release, but less favorable reception among fans. Critics praised the gameplay, art style and story.

A DLC expansion for the game, titled Vergil's Downfall, which takes place after the main game and features Dante's brother Vergil as the playable character, was released on 23 March 2013. A remastered edition of the full game, titled DmC: Definitive Edition, running at 1080p/60fps and including all downloadable content, new costumes and new gameplay features such as a manual targeting system, was released for PlayStation 4 and Xbox One on 10 March 2015. The Definitive Edition and the original PC version were developed by QLOC.

Gameplay

DmC: Devil May Cry is an action-adventure hack and slash video game. Players take on the role of Dante as he uses his powers and weaponry to fight against enemies and navigate the treacherous Limbo. Like previous games in the series, Dante can perform combos by attacking with his sword, Rebellion, and shooting with his twin pistols, Ebony and Ivory. New to the series are modifiers to Dante's moveset, known as Angel Mode and Devil Mode, activated by holding down one of the trigger buttons. When in Angel mode, Dante's sword attacks change to the Osiris, a speedy scythe type weapon, whilst Devil mode uses the slower but more powerful axe, Arbiter. These modes also alter Dante's mobility. Using Angel mode allows Dante to pull himself towards enemies and various points in each level, whilst Devil mode lets Dante pull enemies and objects towards him. Dante is also able to dash across large gaps in Angel mode. All of these moves can be used in conjunction with each other to perform massive combos, which are ranked based on the damage the player makes. When enough power has been gathered, Dante can activate Devil Trigger mode, which slows down time around him and levitates enemies into the air, allowing him to perform much stronger attacks. Like previous games, Dante can collect various types of souls which can be used to recover health, purchase items and upgrade Dante's moveset.

Plot

The game is set in a parallel universe of the series. The game's story takes place in Limbo City, a modern-day city secretly controlled by all-powerful demons, manipulating humanity through the comforts of life, with the demons themselves residing in a parallel plane called "Limbo". Living on the fringes of society is Dante, a young man aware of the existence of demons, devoting himself to fighting them in secret but otherwise wasting his life by indulging in junk food and sex.

One day, Dante is warned by a young woman named Kat that he is in danger, just as a Hunter demon drags him into Limbo and smashes his trailer parked at the end of Bellevue Pier. Dante grabs his weapons and slays the Hunter with Kat's help, as she can see into Limbo with her psychic powers. Dante returns to the human world and accepts Kat's offer to meet with her boss, Vergil.

Along the way, Kat explains that Vergil leads "The Order", an organization intent on exposing the demons and releasing the world from their control. Vergil explains that he wants Dante to join the Order. Dante learns that he and Vergil are not only long-lost twin brothers but also Nephilim, the children of an angel and a demon and the only beings capable of killing the cruel demon king Mundus. Their father Sparda was Mundus' chief lieutenant in the war against the angels until he betrayed Mundus by fathering twins with the angel Eva. Mundus, afraid of the Nephilim and seeing them as abominations, killed Eva with his own hands. Sparda spirited his sons to safety, wiped their memories for their own protection, and gave each a sword (Rebellion for Dante, Yamato for Vergil). Mundus then captured Sparda and condemned him to eternal torture while vowing to hunt down Dante, unaware of Vergil's existence. After learning of his past by visiting his family's decrepit mansion, Dante resolves to help Vergil bring down Mundus and his regime.

Dante, with help from Kat, gradually takes down Mundus' operations and slays the demons who manage them on his behalf. During the final stages of his campaign, Dante witnesses a SWAT team raid the Order's headquarters, killing all of Vergil's followers. Dante rescues Vergil from Limbo but is helpless to protect Kat from being brutally beaten and taken to Mundus. Dante then kidnaps Lilith, Mundus' demon concubine carrying his unborn child, and offers to trade her to Mundus for Kat. During the exchange, Vergil brutally slaughters Lilith, killing Mundus' heir. He, Dante, and Kat narrowly escape as Mundus tears much of the city apart in an outburst of power that weakens the "Hellgate", a portal to the demon world within his stronghold in Silver Sacks Tower. Kat, recovering from her injuries, leads the brothers through a detailed plan to infiltrate the Tower and defeat Mundus. Dante draws Mundus out of his lair and Vergil seals the Hellgate, rendering Mundus mortal. Mundus forms a massive body for himself from the city's rubble and confronts the brothers, but Dante is able to reach his original, physical body and destroy him. Limbo collapses into the human world, making demons visible to humans and creating chaos and pandemonium worldwide.

With Mundus dead, Vergil reveals his true intentions: he intends to rule humanity in the demon king's place. Vergil argues that as Nephilim, he and Dante must protect humans "from themselves"; he also abandons Kat, regarding her as worthless simply because she is human. Dante is appalled by his brother's true nature and the two fight, with Dante emerging victorious. Kat stops Dante from killing his brother and Vergil leaves in disgrace. Faced with a world now infested with demons and abandoned by the only family he has left, Dante questions his own identity and purpose. Kat comforts him by claiming that he is "Dante, nothing more and nothing less". With his hair now completely white after using the full extent of his demonic power, Dante decides to devote himself to protecting humans by hunting down demons.

The DLC chapter Vergil's Downfall reveals what happens to Vergil after losing to his brother. He finds himself in an unknown dimension, where he is guided by the voice of his mother to "head toward the lights". Vergil follows the lights, only to be confronted by illusions of Kat and Dante, the latter of whom stabs him again. Vergil is saved by an illusion of himself and is forced to fight hordes of demons while he recovers from the wounds he suffered at Dante's hands. Vergil "kills" the illusions of his brother and Kat, and his mother disappears after expressing horror at seeing the monster her son has become. Vergil completes his ordeal by killing his own illusion in combat, and is returned to the real world. Demons approach him and bow at his feet, accepting him as their new king. Confident in his future, Vergil departs to lead his new army to places unknown.

Development

The game was officially announced by Capcom at their press conference during the 2010 Tokyo Game Show in September, confirming an earlier rumour in the May 2010 issue of Game Informer which said that the fifth Devil May Cry game would be developed by Ninja Theory. The Japanese Capcom staff told the Western staff to make a game with a different direction. Although their previous game, Devil May Cry 4, was a commercial success the staff thought about rebooting the series taking into account how other game series had better sales. They chose Ninja Theory, impressed with their work on Heavenly Sword which the staff thought would work with a Devil May Cry game. Ninja Theory's creative director Tameem Antoniades stated that DmCs system would contain mechanics that would set him apart from other action titles, in particularly Bayonetta, developed by PlatinumGames and directed by the creator of Devil May Cry, Hideki Kamiya. Lead producer Alex Jones stated they still wanted to compete with Platinum in terms of gameplay and storytelling. The idea of a town being alive that wishes to kill the player added a new element never seen before in the Devil May Cry series. The actions of Limbo City are inspired by previous Devil May Cry games, where the environments would close whenever Dante was surrounded by enemies. Combat designer Rahni Tucker commented on how newcomers to the series have difficulties understanding how advance players from the classic Devil May Cry games could perform several combos that combined multiple skills and weapons. As a result, she designed the combat to be appeal to newcomers so that they could easily perform elaborated combos, while still offering gameplay that advance players would enjoy.

Most of the game was finished as of April 2012 with Capcom aiding Ninja Theory in tweaking few aspects for the final product. Capcom became heavily involved in the combat system to ensure the character's responsive moves and add new air combos never seen before in the franchise. The development team included over ninety members with nearly ten of them being from Capcom. While Capcom's Hideaki Itsuno oversaw the project, Jones and Motohide Eshiro acted as producers. They wanted to aid the Ninja Theory developers in making DmC play more like the previous Devil May Cry games. The release of the PC version was delayed for a faster release of the console iterations. However, Ninja Theory was planning to start launching of the PC version shortly afterwards the console version, aiming for the shortest gap possible. This depended on the time that the PC version finishes development. As a result of speculation regarding Vergil being a playable character, Jones stated that Dante would be the only one controlled by the player. The game uses Unreal Engine 3.

Dante's design was originally meant to be similar to that of previous games, but Capcom told the Ninja Theory staff it had to be completely different to appeal to a younger demographic. While the original Dante was designed from a Japanese perspective, the new one was made from a Western perspective. The final model was inspired by Christopher Nolan's film The Dark Knight as Tameem Antoniades from Ninja Theory commented they wished to make the character realistic. In an interview published by Official Xbox Magazine, Jones explained that he has received numerous death threats in the form of comic books and a metal song due to the controversial decision to reboot the series. Antoniades responded to criticism stating they would not change the design as the character is supposed to fit within the game's setting. Antoniades stated that the gameplay would be similar to previous Devil May Cry games. In November 2011, an extended trailer and new concept art was released. In May 2012, Capcom announced they expect the game to ship 2 million copies by the ending of this fiscal year without giving yet a proper release date. The music for the game was composed by electronic groups Noisia and Combichrist. A playable demo was released on 20 November 2012.

In December 2014, Capcom announced that the definitive edition of the game is being released for the PlayStation 4 and Xbox One. The game contains numerous new improvements and features such as the 1080p resolution and 60 fps frame rate, rebalanced gameplay, all downloadable content available to the previous generation versions, a new Bloody Palace mode for Vergil, a Turbo Mode which gives a 20 percent boost to game speed, Hardcore mode which increases the game's difficulty, Gods Must Die difficulty level wherein enemies immediately use Devil Trigger and deal 2.5 times the normal damage, Must Style mode wherein enemies can only be damaged when the style rank is S and above, new costumes unavailable to the previous versions, updated trophies and achievements, and new leaderboards for Hardcore mode.

Downloadable content
A few days after the release of the game on Windows, the first "Costume Pack" downloadable content (DLC) was released for all consoles. The packs contains several outfits for Dante to use in the main game, which includes a Devil May Cry 3: Dante's Awakening outfit, a "Dark Dante" outfit and a "Neo Dante" outfit.

On 20 February 2013, the second DLC for the game, called Bloody Palace, was released. The free DLC is a survival mode, pitting players against 101 waves of enemies and bosses. Along with Bloody Palace, there is also a "Weapons Bundle" DLC, which includes three sets of skins (Bone, Gold and Samurai) for three in-game weapons (Arbiter, Osiris and Revenant). The bundle also unlocks two in-game perks, Orb Harvester and Item Finder, plus gives the player three upgrade points. The skin packs were previously available as store-exclusive pre-order DLCs for the PlayStation 3 and Xbox 360 versions.

On 6 March 2013, the fourth DLC, Vergil's Downfall, was released. The DLC adds a new section in the main game, giving players a new single-player campaign featuring Vergil as the main character. The DLC has its own leaderboard, stats and set of achievements/trophies. This DLC is available for free for those who have pre-ordered the game on PlayStation 3 and Xbox 360.

Reception

Pre-release
Before the game was released, early reception to the new design of Dante and change in direction of the series was negative. The series' original creator, Hideki Kamiya, was negative about the game's direction and stated he was "missing" Dante although in later tweets he expected people to try the game. Video game publications 1UP.com and GamesRadar found such claims exaggerated, with the former finding the demo's gameplay and humour enjoyable and the latter being optimistic about how the release of the game could affect the franchise. Various other sites also listed it as one of the most anticipated games of 2012 stating that, despite the controversy the game caused, it looked promising, owing to the presentation and the fact the gameplay had yet to be tested. In September 2012, Capcom US producer Alex Jones claimed that some of the negative response had turned positive. Dante's voice actor from Devil May Cry 3 and 4, Reuben Langdon, while expressing disappointment with Dante's characterisation, had positive impressions about the game and urged fans to try it.

Post-release

DmC: Devil May Cry received "generally favorable" reviews, according to review aggregator Metacritic.

The game's story received positive responses from critics. Jose Otero from 1UP.com thought that the story successfully combined with the game's gameplay. In addition, he praised the quality of the game's well-directed cutscenes. Ryan  Clements from IGN considered the game's storytelling a refinement for the series. However, he criticised the length of the game's campaign, which he thought was too short. Ryan Taljonick from GamesRadar criticised the game's campaign as he called it "predictable". He considered it a missed opportunity for DmC.

The game's gameplay also received positive responses. Otero called the combat flexible, and thought that the developer had created a lot of memorable levels and stages with the use of Limbo. Rich Stanton from Eurogamer praised the flow of combat, and thought that the use of the Rebellion in the game "an awesome achievement". Despite that, he criticised the platforming section of the game, which he found boring. He further criticised the design of the game's boss battles, which he thought, was very disappointing. Clements thought that the game's combat system was the "most intelligent design to date", in which he praised the game's simple user interface and combo system. Despite that, he criticised the game's camera, which he thought had failed to catch up with the combat. Juba praised the game's combat variety and accessible controls. He also thought that the game's gameplay significantly increases the replayability of the game.

The game's art style received acclaim. Stantion thought that the game's art-style is striking to look at. Clements praised the game's visuals, which he described as "stunning". Joe Juba from Game Informer also praised the game's artistic direction, and he thought that the game's visuals install a sense of unpleasantness and surrealism to the game's alternate universe. The game's boss design was praised by Taljonick, but he expressed disappointment that these enemies are not fun to play with. In addition, he criticised the lack of enemy variety in the game.

Otero praised Ninja Theory for removing some of Dante's old and unappealing personalities, and making him a protagonist that is approachable for players. He described it as "a fresh and imaginative take on Dante". Clements thought that the redesigned hero is more relatable for players. Rich Stanton from Eurogamer is also positive about Dante's re-design, calling it one of the best reinventions of a character in gaming history. In contrast, Chris Schilling from VideoGamer.com was negative about the redesign, as he found the new Dante lacking some of the original's iconic features.

With the announcement of Devil May Cry 5, Producer Matt Walker reiterated that while Capcom is returning to the original series "...this isn't a slight at Ninja Theory or DmC at all. We all love DmC." Matt explains "Itsuno-san himself has explicitly stated that in his mind, DmC is just as important as any of the other titles in the series, and he's just as proud of it." Continuing, "That game had an amazing world all its own, that could only have been produced by the amazing artists and imaginations at Ninja Theory."

Sales
Capcom initially hoped to ship 2 million copies by the end of its financial year; later, it revised its predictions to 1.2 million copies shipped. Reasons given by Capcom included a "delayed response to the expanding digital contents market," "insufficient coordination between the marketing and the game development divisions in overseas markets," and a "decline in quality due to excessive outsourcing", though whether or not any of the comments were applicable to DmC: Devil May Cry or Capcom itself was left ambiguous.  The game sold 116,000 units in its first week in Japan and made the top spot in the charts. The game also reached the top spot in the UK's sales charts, though only made a third of the sales of Devil May Cry 4. Capcom stated that the sales of the original game were "solid" but noted that the game did not catch Eastern gamers' attention and made less than its previous iteration, Devil May Cry 4. In an interview with GameSpot in 2015, Hideaki Itsuno stated in regards to the game's performance, “If it had been a world changing hit, it might have changed the course of the series by becoming the new DMC. But at the same time, if it was a lot less successful than it was, it might have just been a flash in the pan failure that never got followed through with the definitive edition this year. In a way, I’m actually really pleased of where we were able to hit between those two separate extremes”. Capcom reported in September 2015 that the company was "very happy" with the sales of the Definitive Edition.  As of December 31, 2022, 2.80 million copies of the original version have been sold worldwide, while the Definitive Edition sold an additional 1.20 Million copies, bringing to total amount between all versions to 4 million copies.

References

External links
 
 DmC: Devil May Cry at MobyGames
 DmC: Devil May Cry - Definitive Edition at MobyGames

2013 video games
Action-adventure games
Capcom games
Dark fantasy video games
Devil May Cry
Fratricide in fiction
Hack and slash games
Limbo
Ninja Theory games
PlayStation 3 games
PlayStation 4 games
Science fantasy video games
Single-player video games
Terrorism in fiction
Unreal Engine games
Video game reboots
Video games about angels
Video games about demons
Video games about siblings
Video games based on mythology
Video games developed in the United Kingdom
Video games scored by Jason Graves
Video games using Havok
Video games with alternative versions
Windows games
Works by Alex Garland
Xbox 360 games
Xbox One games